The Lights are an independent rock band from Seattle, WA formed in 1998. They mainly tour in the Pacific Northwest, especially in and around Seattle. Their last national tour was their West Coast tour in the fall of 2006. They made KEXP's Top 90.3 of 2006 and were the winners of The Strangers 2004 "Best Band in Seattle" contest. Guitarist and vocalist Craig Chambers also plays guitar for Love Tan. Drummer PJ Rogalski also plays for Unnatural Helpers. Local Seattle newspaper The Stranger called them "one of this city's top eclectic-sounding talents."

Members
 Craig Chambers – vocals, guitar
 PJ Rogalski – drums
 Jeff Albertson – bass, vocals

Discography
 The Lights (EP) (Spring 2003)
 Beautiful Bird (CD) (Summer 2003) Bop Tart Records
 Wood and Wire (EP) (2004) Childstar Records
 Suge Knight Sweetheart (7" Single) (2005) Childstar Records
 Diamonds and Dirt (2006) CD Wantage USA and LP [the Swingline]
 Failed Graves (2010) LP Wantage USA

References

 The Lights at Allmusic

External links
 The Lights Myspace page
 The Lights Official Website

Alternative rock groups from Washington (state)